Falaver may refer to:
 Falaver-e Bala
 Falaver-e Pain